Sicard de Lordat was a 14th-century architect from the County of Foix, now in modern-day France, who worked for Gaston Fébus (Gaston III of Foix-Béarn). He is noted particularly for working with brick, a material that was cheap and allowed speedier construction.

Works
 Château de Mauvezin
 Château de Montaner
 Château de Morlanne
 Keep of the Château de Pau

References

14th-century French architects
People from Foix